José Izquierdo Martínez (born 3 August 1980) is a Spanish former footballer who played as a right back.

Club career
Izquierdo was born in Arnedo, La Rioja. A product of CA Osasuna's youth ranks, he made his La Liga debut against Villarreal CF on 8 September 2001, in a 0–3 away loss. In the 2003–04 season he played 35 league games, scoring in a 1–1 draw at neighbours Athletic Bilbao.

Released by Osasuna in June 2008 after only totalling 27 appearances in his last three years, Izquierdo signed a one-year contract with second division side Gimnàstic de Tarragona, on 31 August 2008. The following campaign he dropped down a level and returned to his native region, moving to UD Logroñés.

For 2011–12, the 31-year-old Izquierdo continued in the third tier, joining CD Atlético Baleares.

Personal life
Although Izquierdo played as a right back, his name in Spanish means "left".

References

External links
Stats at Liga de Fútbol Profesional 

1980 births
Living people
People from Arnedo
Spanish footballers
Footballers from La Rioja (Spain)
Association football defenders
La Liga players
Segunda División players
Segunda División B players
CA Osasuna B players
CA Osasuna players
Gimnàstic de Tarragona footballers
UD Logroñés players
CD Atlético Baleares footballers